The following highways are numbered 792:

United States